, is a 1989 fighting arcade game developed and published by Taito.

Violence Fight was later included in Taito Memories Vol. 2 for the PlayStation 2, and Taito Legends 2 for the PlayStation 2, Xbox and Windows. Violence Fight was also followed by a sequel released two years later titled as Solitary Fighter (known in Japan as ).

Plot
As the attract screen explains (albeit with an English localization which had a poor translation of the original Japanese script), the game takes place during the early 1950s in the United States, where an underground tournament known as the "Violence Fight" had become very popular among the criminal underworld and the public at large; criminals, especially mobsters, along with other public nuisances and upstanding citizens are allured by its stakes and thrill. The contestants, drawn from all across the country, compete for large sums of money and the title of "No. 1 Quarreler". As the game begins, the tournament even attracts a young fighter named Bad Blue (or "Bat Blue") from Los Angeles who competes for the title of No. 1 Quarreler and aspires to share a small fortune with his manager, "Blinks".

Gameplay
Violence Fight plays similarly to other beat 'em ups like Double Dragon, Renegade and River City Ransom, where the player can move in all eight directions in an arena fight. Also, there are three buttons: punch, kick and jump. However, unlike most side-scrolling fighters, the players fight in an enclosed arena space. Players can press either punch + jump or kick + jump to perform either a special punch or a special kick move. Players also can press punch + kick to duck for a short period of time. While the opponent is struggling to get up, the punch button can be used to throw him to the ground for some damage. The punch button is also used to pick up crates, barrels and other similar objects.

Each match consists of up to three rounds. The timer will initially be set at 100 seconds, or 1 minute, 40 seconds. The objective is to get opponent's life meter to zero to win a round. Winning two out of three rounds will win the match. Each brawler begins the round with 100 health points. Direct hits to opponent will reduce his health gradually, based on certain factors. For each round won, the players gain one point towards winning the match. If time runs out in a round, the round will end in a draw. If two of three rounds end in a draw, the brawler with only one point will be the winner. If the point totals are tied at the end of all three rounds, the match ends in a draw. If the players gets more points than the opponent, they will continue on to the next gameplay round, or "stage" of the game. If the opponent has more points than the player, the game is over and there is the option of continuing the game, at the cost of one additional coin. If the match ends in a draw against the CPU, it will be the same as a loss. If the match ends in a draw of a 2-player match, either player will have to insert another coin to continue the single-player campaign.

Characters
There are four playable fighters, and two unplayable bosses.
  – A yester-year street-fighting champion from Los Angeles, California. As far as attributes are concerned, he is the most well-balanced and has a reputation for plenty of technique and its sharpness. Some menus in the English version call him "Bat Blue" instead.
  – An African-American U.S. Marine veteran from Carson City, Nevada. His fighting style is boxing. During his U.S. marine career, he was nicknamed "Fierce Eagle", due to his speed and reflexes. His speed attribute is high, but everything else is lower than average.
  – A professional wrestler from Ardmore, Oklahoma who was expelled from the TWF (Taito Wrestling Federation) for killing thirteen of his opponents during sanctioned matches. He enters the tournament hoping to redeem himself of his past sins. He bears a passing resemblance to wrestler Gorgeous George. In the English version, the name is mistranslated to "Lick Joe".
  – A mysterious Chinese martial artist from Miami, Florida. Although a natural-born U.S. citizen, Lee spent many of his childhood summers visiting China with his father, learning the art of fighting. Lee enters the tournament hoping to prove his skills to thousands of fans.

Bosses
  – A stock farmer from Texas who has a head that's as hard as steel. He wears a white shirt, blue jeans and red suspenders. When the player fights against him, the audience will be throwing empty beer bottles into the ring, causing unnecessary setbacks to the player's plans to win this match.
  – A tall New Yorker who resembles Mr. T. He'll do anything to win the match, even if it means breaking every rule in the book, like swinging a chain against his opponent. He's also the leader of the Black Will 'O gang, the organization who set up the Violence Fight tournament in the very first place.

Reception 
In Japan, Game Machine listed Violence Fight on their January 15, 1990 issue as being the thirteenth most-successful table arcade unit of the month.

See also
 Street Smart (video game)

References

External links

Violence Fight at arcade-history

1989 video games
Arcade video games
Multiplayer video games
Square Enix franchises
Fighting games
Video games set in the 1950s
Video games set in the United States
Taito arcade games
Taito B System games
Video games developed in Japan